Carmaux is a commune in the Tarn department in southern France.

Industries

The Compagnie minière de Carmaux has its origins in a coal mining concession granted in 1852 to Gabriel de Solages, which became the Compagnie minière de Carmaux. He also founded a glass bottle factory, fueled by the coal.
Carmaux was famous for its industries of coal mining (from the thirteenth century to 2000) and its glassworks (from the eighteenth century to 1931).

Geography
The Cérou flows northwestward through the commune and crosses the town. Carmaux station has rail connections to Toulouse, Albi and Rodez.

Demographics

Famous residents
 Bernard Lazare: journalist
 Jean Jaurès: politician
 Jack Cantoni: France Rugby Union International 1970–4

See also
Communes of the Tarn department

References

External links
 Carmaux official website

Communes of Tarn (department)
Languedoc